Ivan Golovachov (born 21 May 1929) is a Soviet sprint canoeist who competed in the late 1950s. He won a silver medal in the K-2 1000 m event at the 1958 ICF Canoe Sprint World Championships in Prague. Golovatzhev also finished fourth in the K-2 1000 m event at the 1960 Summer Olympics in Rome. He was born in Kherson.

References

External links
 

1929 births
Possibly living people
Sportspeople from Kherson
Canoeists at the 1960 Summer Olympics
Olympic canoeists of the Soviet Union
Soviet male canoeists
ICF Canoe Sprint World Championships medalists in kayak